Sweet Tea is the 11th studio album by American blues artist Buddy Guy, released in 2001 on Silvertone/Jive label. It was  nominated for 2001 Grammy Award for Best Contemporary Blues Album.

Track listing

Personnel
Buddy Guy - vocals, guitar
Davey Faragher - bass
Tommy Lee Miles -  Drums 
James "Jimbo" Mathus - Rhythm guitar

Additional musicians and production
Sam Carr - drums
Dennis Herring - producer, mixing
Clay Jones - mixing
Craig Krampf - percussion
Doug Sax - mastering
Chris Shepard - engineer, mixing on "I Gotta Try You Girl"
Pete Thomas - drums
Bobby Whitlock - piano

Charts

Citations

References 

Buddy Guy albums
Jive Records albums
2001 albums